UAF may refer to:

Organisations
 Uganda Athletics Federation
 Ukrainian Air Force
 Ukrainian Armed Forces
 Ukrainian Association of Football
 Financial Intelligence Unit, in Panama, Paraguay and other Latin-American countries

  (French Airports Association)
 Unite Against Fascism, United Kingdom
 United Arab Emirates Air Force (ICAO Code UAF)
 University Admissions Finland
 University of Agriculture, Faisalabad, Pakistan
 University of Alaska Fairbanks, United States
 Unco AF Football Club, Australia

Other uses

 Use after free, a class of software vulnerability
 Universal Authentication Framework; see FIDO Alliance
 Universal Access Fund; see Digicel
 Unified Architecture Framework; see UAF Specification from Object Management Group